Bresch is a surname. Notable people with the surname include:

Carsten Bresch (born 1921), German physicist and geneticist
Heather Bresch, American business executive
Manon Bresch, French-Cameroonian actress